War is the fourth studio album by the Dutch hardcore band Born from Pain. The album was released in 2006 on November 17 (Germany, Austria, Switzerland) and November 20 (rest of Europe) through Metal Blade Records.

Track listing

Personnel
Born from Pain
Ché Snelting - vocals
Karl Fieldhouse - guitars
Dominik Stammen - guitars
Rob Franssen - bass guitar
Roel Klomp - drums

Guest musicians
Jan-Chris de Koeijer - vocals on "Crusader"
Mark "Barney" Greenway - vocals on "Behind Enemy Lines (alternate version)"
Lou Koller - Vocals on "Doomsday Clock"
Peter "Pepe" Lyse Hansen - vocals on "Scorched Earth"

Production
Tue Madsen - producer, engineering, mixing, mastering
René Natzel - art direction, design

References 

2006 albums
Born from Pain albums
Metal Blade Records albums
Albums produced by Tue Madsen